Puni is a village in Ghōr Province, Afghanistan.

References

See also
Ghōr Province

Populated places in Ghor Province